Larry Mason is a former running back in the National Football League and the United States Football League.

Biography
Mason was born on March 21, 1961 in Birmingham, Alabama.
He now owns a fencing company in the Birmingham area.

Career
Mason was a member of the Jacksonville Bulls of the USFL in 1984 and 1985. He then joined the Cleveland Browns during the 1987 NFL season. The following season, he played for the Green Bay Packers. Mason also played for the Calgary Stampeders of the CFL in 1985. He was Calgary's leading rusher during the 1985 season, despite only playing five games.

He played at the collegiate level at Troy State University and the University of Southern Mississippi.

See also
List of Green Bay Packers players

References

Jacksonville Bulls players
Cleveland Browns players
Green Bay Packers players
American football running backs
Troy University alumni
University of Southern Mississippi alumni
Troy Trojans football players
Players of American football from Birmingham, Alabama
Southern Miss Golden Eagles football players
National Football League replacement players
Living people
1961 births